Obihiro Shrine (帯廣神社, Obihiro jinja) is a Shinto shrine located in Obihiro, Hokkaido. Erected in 1910, it is dedicated to the kami Ōkuni-mitama no mikoto (大國魂神), Ōkuninushi no mikoto (大那牟遲神), and Sukunabikona no mikoto (少彦名神). Its annual festival is on September 24. Obihiro Shrine was formerly ranked as a prefectural shrine.

See also
List of Shinto shrines in Hokkaidō

External links
Official website
Hokkaido Shinto listing

Shinto shrines in Hokkaido
1910 establishments in Japan

Beppyo shrines